Phalla Union council takes its name from the chief village in the area. It is one of the most densely populated union councils of Abbottabad District in Khyber-Pakhtunkhwa province of Pakistan. Most of the area is hilly. 
These mountain are linked with the mountains of the Murree and Margalla hills of Islamabad. Village Phalla and Ghambir are thickly populated area of this Union Council.

Villages 
 Bhajora 
Charr syedia
Chankot
Charbat
Dakhan Paiser
Ghambir
Rahi
Rakhala
Roppar
kotlayan
Ghoryan
Atteran
Kund Battal
Tarala
Badala
Pattan

Ethnic groups 
 Rajputs,Abbasis, Karlals, Syeds, Awans , Mughals , Qureshis , khokhars and Chaudharys are living in this valley. All families are living side by side with harmony and brotherhood.

Location 

Phallah Village is in a valley situated on the Lora-Shah Maqsood Road, 6 miles from Lora and 16 miles from Ghoragali (Murree). It is surrounded by two large and mountains called Muri and Khadan. Entrance to the village on the Lora side is from a narrow road called Gali. As soon as you enter the valley you will see a range of attractive dwellings houses that look to be on top of each other like a multistory building. Riala and Rupper are other  villages located 2 miles west of Phallah. Government Middle School and primary School for boys at Pallah Gali.

The Union Council of Phallah is located in the most south-westerly part of Abbottabad District, to its east Murree is located, on the west it is bordered by [Haripur District] and to the south it is bordered by Islamabad/Rawalpindi District] of [Punjab (Pakistan)|Punjab province].

Owing to its location it is an easily accessible village. Phallah is divided into two parts (Rara and Para phallah) divided by a stream. An old water well is located at the centre of both parts from where most of the people avail water. 
Atteran, Rupar and badala are situated in surrounding of phallah. Rahi village council also part of the UC Phalla. The main location is Rahi also one of beautiful visitors place vally Rahi is most popular sit in Phalla. There are three big Masajid located at rara Phallah, Para Phallah and at opposite Atteran along with small mosques in Mahallah. There is an Eid Gaha located centrally where all people offered pray Eid Namaz. Government Middle School for girls at para Phallah and a Govt Primary School at Atteran.

References 

Union councils of Abbottabad District

fr:Phallah